Elizabeth Jane Goddard (born 31 March 1969), known as Beth Goddard, is a British actress known for her role as Suze Littlewood in the  BBC comedy series Gimme Gimme Gimme.

Early life
Goddard grew up in Clacton-on-Sea, Essex, and attended Clacton County High School and the Rose Bruford College in Sidcup, Greater London, from 1986 to 1989.

Career
One of Goddard's first television roles was as unscrupulous journalist Clare Moody in the 1994 episode "To Be a Somebody" of the ITV drama Cracker. She played Belinda Ashton in the ITV detective drama Lewis in 2008, and also starred as Suze Littlewood in the comedy Gimme Gimme Gimme, her best known role. Goddard appeared alongside her husband Philip Glenister in the third series of BBC One drama Ashes to Ashes in 2010.

Personal life
Goddard met her husband, Philip Glenister, best known for his role as Gene Hunt in TV drama Life on Mars, at a birthday party for Jamie Glover in 1997. They married in 2006. The couple have two daughters, Millie and Charlotte, born in 2002 and 2005 respectively.

Credits

Agatha Christie's Poirot "The Case of the Missing Will" (Violet Wilson) 1993
Peak Practice TV Series (Leanda Sharpe) (1993–95)
Cracker TV Series (Clare Moody) 1994
A Business Affair (Student) 1994
Degrees of Error TV Series (Anna Peirce) 1995
Moving Story TV Series (Emma) 1995
The Perfect Match TV drama (Mandy) 1995
Beautiful Thing (Brewery Official) 1996
Karaoke (mini) TV Series (Woman on Phone) 1996
Bugs (series 2): A Cage for Satan TV Series (Cassandra Newmann) 1996
Bugs (series 2): Bureau of Weapons TV Series (Cassandra Neumann) 1996
Ellington TV Series (Kelly Logan) 1996
Sunnyside Farm TV Series (Wendy) 1997
Thornapple (TV) (Mirabel Davenport) 1997
Roger Roger (TV) (Melanie) 1998
Catherine Cookson’s - Tilly Trotter (TV) (Ellen Ross) 1999
Gimme Gimme Gimme TV Series (Suze Littlewood) 1999–2001
The Scarlet Pimpernel (mini) TV Series (Suzanne De Tourney) 1999
The Last Seduction II (Murphy) 1999
Big Bad World TV Series (Kath Shand) 1999
Daylight Robbery (mini) TV Series (Harriet Howell) 2000
A Touch of Frost TV Series (Helen Fox in episode "Line of Fire") 2000
Take Me (mini) TV Series (Kay Chambers) 2001
Daylight Robbery 2 (mini) TV Series 2001
The Eustace Bros. TV Series (Melissa Garvey) 2003
 Midsomer Murders "A Tale of Two Hamlets" (Wendy Smythe-Webster) 2003
Frances Tuesday (TV) (Bishop) 2004
 Vital Signs (Maddy McCartney) 2006
 The Last Detective (Claire Symmons) 2006
 The Sarah Jane Adventures: "Eye of the Gorgon" (Sister Helena) 2007
 Lewis "The Great and the Good" (Belinda Ashton) 2008
Agatha Christie's Poirot "Appointment with Death" (Sister Agnieszka) 2008
 Ashes to Ashes Series 3 Episode 2 (Elaine Downing) 2010
 New Tricks Series 7 episode 2 (Paula Symes) 2010
 Midsomer Murders "Dark Secrets" (Selina Stanton) 2011
 Casualty (Hannah Fleet) 2011
 X-Men: First Class (Mrs Xavier – cameo) 2011
 Edge of Tomorrow (Secretary – Judith) 2014
 Cucumber (Claire Baxter) 2015
 Silent Witness One of Our Own (Trish Fallon) 2015
 A Street Cat Named Bob (Hilary) 2016
 Outlander "Of Lost Things" (Louisa Dunsany) 2017
 The Serpent Queen TV Series (Antoinette de Guise) 2022
 Doc Martin (Helen Parsons) 2022

References

External links
 

1969 births
Alumni of Rose Bruford College
English film actresses
English television actresses
Living people
People from Clacton-on-Sea
People from Colchester
Actresses from Essex
20th-century English actresses
21st-century English actresses
Glenister acting family